David Pierre Ruelle (born 20 August 1935) is a Belgian mathematical physicist, naturalized French. He has worked on statistical physics and dynamical systems. With Floris Takens, Ruelle coined the term strange attractor, and developed a new theory of turbulence.

Biography 
Ruelle studied physics at the Université Libre de Bruxelles, obtaining a PhD degree in 1959 under the supervision of Res Jost. He spent two years (1960–1962) at the ETH Zurich, and another two years (1962–1964) at the Institute for Advanced Study in Princeton, New Jersey. In 1964, he became professor at the Institut des Hautes Études Scientifiques in Bures-sur-Yvette, France. Since 2000, he has been an emeritus professor at IHES and distinguished visiting professor at Rutgers University.

David Ruelle made fundamental contributions in various aspects of mathematical physics. In quantum field theory, the most important contribution is the rigorous formulation of scattering processes based on Wightman's axiomatic theory. This approach is known as the Haag–Ruelle scattering theory. Later Ruelle helped to create a rigorous theory of statistical mechanics of equilibrium, that includes the study of the thermodynamic limit, the equivalence of ensembles, and the convergence of Mayer's series. A further result is the Asano-Ruelle lemma, which allows the study of the zeros of certain polynomial functions that are recurrent in statistical mechanics.

The study of infinite systems led to the local definition of Gibbs states or to the global definition of equilibrium states. Ruelle demonstrated with Roland L. Dobrushin and Oscar E. Lanford that translationally invariant Gibbs states are precisely the equilibrium states.

Together with Floris Takens, he proposed the description of hydrodynamic turbulence based on strange attractors with chaotic properties of hyperbolic dynamics.

Honors and awards 
Since 1985 David Ruelle has been a member of the French Academy of Sciences and in 1988 he was Josiah Willard Gibbs Lecturer in Atlanta, Georgia. Since 1992 he has been an international honorary member of the American Academy of Arts and Sciences and since 1993 ordinary member of the Academia Europaea. Since 2002 he has been an international member of the United States National Academy of Sciences and since 2003 a foreign member of the Accademia Nazionale dei Lincei. Since 2012 he has been a fellow of the American Mathematical Society.

In 1985 David Ruelle was awarded the Dannie Heineman Prize for Mathematical Physics and in 1986 he received the Boltzmann Medal for his outstanding contributions to statistical mechanics. In 1993 he won the Holweck Prize and in 2004 he received the Matteucci Medal. In 2006 he was awarded the Henri Poincaré Prize and in 2014 he was honored with the prestigious Max Planck Medal for his achievements in theoretical physics. In 2022, Ruelle was awarded the ICTP's Dirac Medal for Mathematical Physics, along with Elliott H. Lieb and Joel Lebowitz,  "for groundbreaking and mathematically rigorous contributions to the understanding of the statistical mechanics of classical and quantum physical systems".

Selected publications 

  ; hbk
  1st edition 1969
  1st edition 1978
 
 
  1989 edition
  1989 1st edition

See also 

 Axiomatic quantum field theory
 Chaos theory
 Dynamical systems theory
 Dobrushin–Lanford–Ruelle equations
 Fluid mechanics
 Haag–Ruelle scattering theory
 Ruelle zeta-function
 Sinai–Ruelle–Bowen measure
 Statistical physics
 Strange attractor
 Transfer operator

References

External links 

 
 .
 .
 
 
 
 
 

1935 births
Living people
20th-century French mathematicians
21st-century French mathematicians
Belgian mathematicians
Belgian physicists
Chaos theorists
Free University of Brussels (1834–1969) alumni
Members of the French Academy of Sciences
Foreign associates of the National Academy of Sciences
Recipients of the Great Cross of the National Order of Scientific Merit (Brazil)
Fellows of the American Mathematical Society
Academic staff of ETH Zurich
Institute for Advanced Study visiting scholars
Rutgers University faculty
Recipients of the Matteucci Medal
Belgian emigrants to France
Winners of the Max Planck Medal
Mathematical physicists
Statistical physicists